Colin Urquhart (1940 – 13 September 2021) was an English Evangelical Christian minister, speaker, author, and apostolic and Neocharismatic leader in the United Kingdom.

Early life 
Urquhart was born in Twickenham, London, England. His father was an architect who designed and built camps for the Ministry of Defense. As a boy, Urquhart experienced bombing from World War II in his neighborhood.

He described his family as "non-Christian". However, he enjoyed singing so he joined the choir of the Anglican Church in Twickenham when he was ten years old. At his request, his parents gave him a book of prayers for his birthday.

Urquhart played cricket for his school and a local club. Middlesex offered him a trial, but he decided not to go. When he was thirteen years old, he asked the vicar how he could become ordained, but the minimum age was sixteen. After school, he followed his family's plan and studied with an architectural firm for a year. 

Urquhart still wanted to become a minister with the Church of England. He recalled, " I had to sit my A' levels before I could go to King's College. I was ordained in 1963 when I was 23."

Career 
He started as a curate for a church in Cheshunt for three years. Next, he was sent to Letchworth in Hertfordshire where he was in charge of a district church. He became involved with the Charismatic Renewal movement in the 1960s and 1970s. He was the incumbent (vicar) of the parish church of St Hugh, Lewsey Luton, Bedfordshire, at the time, and during four years immense changes took place there.

In 1974 he wrote a book about these experiences, called When the Spirit Comes, one of several books he authored during the 1970s. At the start of 1976, he resigned as the incumbent of St Hugh's and moved with his family and two parishioners to a house in East Molesey, Surrey that was owned by Fountain Trust, an international trust involved in Christian renewal. From this base he began an itinerant ministry traveling nationally and internationally, with his living costs arising solely from donations (which some Christians like to refer to as 'living on faith').

Urquhart called this church called the Community of Love and Prayers which he later said: "was nothing like a hippy commune." The BBC made a documentary about the Community of Love and Prayers. In the later 1970s, Urquhart founded the Kingdom Faith Church in Horsham in West Sussex. The church expanded over the years to seven locations and the Kingdom Faith Training College.

By the early 1980s Urquhart was becoming more widely known internationally as a writer, and as a speaker at Charismatic conferences, rallies, and conventions. In the eighties he spoke at some of the Full Gospel Business Men's Fellowship International Conventions in Mumbai, India, based on the theme, "Go in my name" and "If my people" in India. Urquhart recorded more than 500 Faith For Today radio messages.

As of 2014, Urquhart turned over the Kingdom Faith Church to his son, Clive Urquhart. However, Urquhart still spoke at conferences and was the principal of the Kingdom Faith Training College.

Personal life 
Urquhart's wife was Caroline. Their children were Andrea, Clive, and Claire. He died from cancer in 2021 at the age of 81 years.

Publications
When the Spirit Comes (Hodder & Stoughton, 1974) 
Anything You Ask (Hodder & Stoughton, 1980) 
In Jesus Christ (Trafalgar Square Publishing, 1981) 
Faith for the Future (Trafalgar Square Publishing, 1982) 
My Father is the Gardener (Hodder & Stoughton, 1982) 
Holy Fire (Trafalgar Square Publishing, 1984) 
The Positive Kingdom (Hodder & Stoughton, 1985) 
Listen and Live (Trafalgar Square Publishing, 1987) 
Receive Your Healing (Crossroad Publishing, 1987) 
Personal Victory (Hodder & Stoughton Religious Division, 1988) 
My Dear Child: Listening to God's Heart (Hodder & Stoughton, 1990) 
My Dear Son (Hodder Christian Books, 1992) 
The Truth That Sets You Free (Hodder & Stoughton Religious, 1993) 
The Handbook on Healing (Thomas Nelson Publishers, 1994) 
Your Personal Bible (Hodder & Stoughton Religious, 1994) 
From Mercy to Majesty: Moving into Revival (Hodder and Stoughton, 1995) 
Encountering the Presence (Destiny Image Incorporated, 1998) 
Friends of Jesus (Zondervan, 1997) 
God's Plan for Your Healing: Knowing His Purpose and Explaining His Power (Zondervan, 1998) 
Revival Fire (Zondervan, 1999) 
My Beloved (Zondervan, 2000) 
Faith: The Explaining Series (Sovereign World Ltd, 2000) 
True Life (Kingdom Faith, 2001) 
True Love (Kingdom Faith, 2001) 
True Face (Kingdom Faith, 2002) 
Explaining Deception (Sovereign World, 2003) 
True Church (Kingdom Faith, 2002) 
True Covenant (Kingdom Faith, 2002) 
True Disciples (Kingdom Faith, 2002) 
True Grace (Kingdom Faith, 2002) 	
True Activity (Kingdom Faith, 2003) 	
True Healing (Kingdom Faith, 2003) 
True Prayer (Kingdom Faith, 2003) 
True Salvation (Kingdom Faith, 2003) 	
True Worship (Kingdom Faith, 2003) 
True Kingdom (Kingdom Faith, 2004) 		
True Leadership (Kingdom Faith, 2004) 	
True Peace & Joy (Kingdom Faith, 2004) 
True Promises (Kingdom Faith, 2004) 		
True Revival (Kingdom Faith, 2004) 
True Sons (Kingdom Faith, 2004) 	
True Spirit (Kingdom Faith, 2004) 
The Great Revelation (Integrity Media Europe, 2009) 
The Truth: New Testament (Integrity Media Europe, 2010) 
True God (Kingdom Faith, 2012) 	
The Truth for Today: As Revealed in the Epistles of the New Testament (Kingdom Faith, 2012) 	
The Truth for Today: 1 Corinthians (Kingdom Faith, 2012) 	
The Truth for Today: 2 Corinthians (Kingdom Faith, 2012) 	
The Truth for Today: Ephesians, Colossians & Philippians (Kingdom Faith, 2012) 	
The Truth for Today: Epistles of Paul (Kingdom Faith, 2012) 	
The Truth for Today: Galatians, 1 Thessalonians & 2 Thessalonians (Kingdom Faith, 2012) 	
The Truth for Today: The General Epistles (Kingdom Faith, 2012) 	
The Truth for Today: Hebrews (Kingdom Faith, 2012) 	
The Truth for Today: James, 1 Peter & 2 Peter (Kingdom Faith, 2012) 	
The Truth for Today: Jude, 1 John, 2 John & 3 John (Kingdom Faith, 2012) 		
The Truth for Today: Romans (Kingdom Faith, 2012) 		
The Truth for Today: 1 Timothy, 2 Timothy, Titus & Philemon (Kingdom Faith, 2012) 	
The Truth New Testament Study Edition (New Wine Press, 2013) 		
The Lord's Orchard: God's Charter for Reformation (New Wine Press, 2015) 		
The Truth for Today as Revealed in the Letters of the New Testament (New Wine Press, 2015) 		
Truth That Sets You Free (New Wine Press, 2015) 		
The Blood Speaks (Kingdom Faith, 2019) 		
How to know Jesus (Kingdom Faith, 2019) 		
Your Journey to Heaven (Kingdom Faith, 2019) 	
Anything You Ask: Learn How to Pray with Faith and See God Answer Your Prayers (Kingdom Faith, 2020)

References

External links
 Colin Urquhart.com
 Kingdom Faith Church

1940 births
2021 deaths
Apostolic networks
British New Church Movement
British Charismatics
British evangelicals
People from Twickenham